Salvatore Fergola (Naples, 24 April 1799 - Naples, 7 March 1874) was an Italian painter, mainly of landscapes or vedute in and around his native Naples. He is considered an exponent of the School of Posillipo.

Biography
He was born in Naples. He was the son of the engraver of landscapes, Luigi Fergola and his wife, Teresa Conti. Salvatore was educated in literature and architecture. He became a follower of Jakob Philipp Hackert, who had also mentored his father. Like his father, and other painters such as Giacinto Gigante, he worked for some time in the Royal Topographic office. He was heavily patronized by the Bourbon Court; for example, in 1819 the future Francesco I of the Two Sicilies commissioned views of Naples, including Naples from Capodimonte, Naples from Marinella, Naples from Ponte della Maddalena, a Veduta of the Botanical Gardens.

In 1827, he was nominated honorary professor to the Royal Institute of Arts (Real Istituto di Belle Arti (now the Accademia di Belle Arti di Napoli). Among his pupils was Achille Vertunni, Ignazio Lavagna, and Giuseppe Benassai. He died in Naples in 1874.

He was often utilized to commemorate government works and events: 
for example:
Inauguration of the first railway in Italy, the Naples–Portici line, (Museo di San Martino)
Construction of the first iron suspension bridge in Italy (Ponte Real Ferdinando sul Garigliano).
Construction of  the Chapel in the Campo di Marte (Reggia di Caserta)
Train station for line to Castellammare (1845) (Reggia di Caserta)

Also of note:
Interior of Sala Tarsia
Bridge over Garigliano (Palace of Capodimonte)
Waterfall (Museo di San Martino)
Cain persecuted by ire of God (1849) (Royal Palace of Naples)
Cain and Abel (Avvocatura dello Stato, Naples)
Gesìr che placa la tempesta (Palace of Capodimonte)
San Francesco di Paola in Prayer
Christ in Gesthemane (1858) (Gallery of the Academy of Fine Arts of Naples)
Rest during Flight to Egypt (Royal Palace of Naples)

Bibliography 

Translated in part from Italian Wikipedia entry

References

External links

1799 births
1874 deaths
18th-century Italian painters
Italian male painters
19th-century Italian painters
19th-century Italian male artists
Painters from Naples
Italian vedutisti
Italian landscape painters
19th-century Neapolitan people
Academic staff of the Accademia di Belle Arti di Napoli
18th-century Italian male artists